Archie's TV Laugh-Out was a comic book published by Archie Comics from 1969 to 1986. Sabrina the Teenage Witch appears in all 106 issues, and this title served as a transition for her from Archie's Mad House to her own title. The first issue introduced Sabrina's boyfriend, Harvey Kinkle.

In addition to Sabrina, the title featured regular appearances by the "Archie gang" and Josie and the Pussycats.  The title was intended to showcase characters from Archie Comics's animated TV shows, which included The Archie Show (and its successors), Josie and the Pussycats and Sabrina the Teenage Witch.

References

See also
 List of Archie Comics Publications

Comics magazines published in the United States
Archie Comics titles
1969 comics debuts
1986 comics endings
Teen comedy comics
Romantic comedy comics
Magazines established in 1969
Magazines disestablished in 1986
Defunct magazines published in the United States
Bimonthly magazines published in the United States
Magazines about comics